John Value Dennis (1915/1916 – December 1, 2002) was an American ornithologist and botanist.

Dennis was an undergraduate at George Washington University but his study was interrupted by World War II.  During the war, he served as a radar technician with the Flying Tigers aircraft unit in China.  He finished his undergraduate education at the University of Wisconsin, obtaining a degree in political science.  This was followed by a master's degree in botany from the University of Florida.  He started (but did not complete) a PhD in ornithology at the University of Illinois.

He studied woodpeckers in particular and searched extensively for the critically endangered ivory-billed woodpecker in Cuba and in old-growth forests of the southeastern United States.  In 1948, working with Davis Crompton, he traveled to the Oriente Province of Cuba and located a subspecies, called the Cuban ivory-billed woodpecker, after it had not been reported there for several years. He reported a sighting in the Big Thicket of southeast Texas in 1966, which he called his "only good look at a North American ivorybill"; he returned in 1968, recording what he believed to be the bird's call.  Many ornithologists, including James Tanner, generally regarded as the leading authority on ivory-bills, were skeptical of both the sighting and the recorded bird. His sightings formed part of the basis for the creation of the Big Thicket National Preserve.

He wrote A Complete Guide to Bird Feeding (1975), a book that increased interest in bird feeding.

He was born in Princess Anne, Maryland and died of a brain tumor there in 2002.

Partial list of works
 Dennis, J. V. (1948). "A last remnant of Ivory-billed Woodpecker in Cuba." Auk 65:497–507. 
 —— (1967). "The Ivory-bill flies still." Audubon 69(6):38–45. 
 —— (1975). A Complete Guide to Bird Feeding.
 —— (1988). The Great Cypress Swamp.

References

American ornithologists
2002 deaths
People from Princess Anne, Maryland
American ornithological writers
American male non-fiction writers
Year of birth uncertain